The Whole of the Moon is a 1997 New Zealand/Canadian film about a teenager who is diagnosed with cancer. The film, based on the novel of the same name by Duncan Stewart, was directed by Ian Mune and written by Mune and Lymposs. It stars Toby Fisher, Nikki Si'ulepa, Pascale Bussières, Paul Gittins, and Jane Thomas.

Plot
15-year-old Kirk Mead (Toby Fisher) is a typical fun-loving child, living in Auckland, New Zealand. He likes to hang out with his friend Ronnie (Elliot O'Donnell) and is in a relationship with Tory (Nicola Cliff). One day, he is shockingly diagnosed with cancer. At the hospital, he meets ex-streetkid Marty (Nikki Si'ulepa), who seems to be the exact opposite of him. Despite their differences, Kirk soon develops a first antagonistic, and later friendly relationship with Marty. One night, the two sneak out of the hospital to have one final fling of freedom.

Cast
 Toby Fisher as Kirk Mead
 Nikki Si'ulepa as Marty
 Pascale Bussières as Sarah
 Paul Gittins as Alex Mead
 Jane Thomas as Maureen Mead
 Nicola Cliff as Tory Taylor
 Elliot O'Donnell as Ronnie
 Carl Rand as Mr. Dixon
 Greg Johnson as Mr. Cooper
 Olie Rennie as Peter

Production
The Whole of the Moon was filmed in Auckland, New Zealand.

References

External links

1997 films
Films set in Auckland
1990s English-language films
DHX Media films
New Zealand drama films
English-language Canadian films
Canadian drama films
Films directed by Ian Mune
1990s Canadian films